Dave Houtby (born 1951) is a Canadian former international lawn and indoor bowler.

Bowls career
Houtby won a bronze medal in the fours at the 1992 World Outdoor Bowls Championship in Worthing.

He also won a silver medal in the fours at the 1986 Commonwealth Games in Edinburgh.

He won four medals at the 1991 Asia Pacific Bowls Championships, including a gold in the fours with Ronnie Jones, Dave Brown and Bill Boettger, in Kowloon, Hong Kong.

References

1951 births
Living people
Canadian male bowls players
Commonwealth Games medallists in lawn bowls
Sportspeople from St. Catharines
Commonwealth Games silver medallists for Canada
Bowls players at the 1986 Commonwealth Games
Date of birth missing (living people)
Medallists at the 1986 Commonwealth Games